Kemp Caswell Wicker (born Kemp Caswell Whicker; August 13, 1906 – June 11, 1973) was an American left-handed pitcher in Major League Baseball who played for the New York Yankees from 1936 to 1938 and the Brooklyn Dodgers in 1941.

Wicker was born in Kernersville, North Carolina to Jasper Newton and Alice Crews Wicker. He played collegiately at North Carolina State University. He is most known for pitching one inning in the 1937 World Series for the Yankees.

After retirement Wicker managed in the minor leagues. He died in Kernersville of amyotrophic lateral sclerosis at age 66, the same disease that claimed his teammate Lou Gehrig and Catfish Hunter.

References

External links

1906 births
1973 deaths
Baseball players from North Carolina
Beckley Black Knights players
Binghamton Triplets players
Brooklyn Dodgers players
Carrollton Frogs players
Charleroi Governors players
Columbus Cardinals players
Cumberland Colts players
Goldsboro Goldbugs players
Hanover Raiders players
Houston Buffaloes managers
Jeannette Jays players
Kansas City Blues (baseball) players
Major League Baseball pitchers
Montreal Royals players
NC State Wolfpack baseball players
New York Yankees players
Newark Bears (IL) players
People from Kernersville, North Carolina
Rochester Red Wings players
Sacramento Solons players
St. Louis Cardinals scouts
Wheeling Stogies players